The 1980 Iowa Hawkeyes football team was an American football team that represented the University of Iowa in the 1980 Big Ten Conference football season. In their second season under head coach Hayden Fry, the Hawkeyes finished in fourth place in the Big Ten Conference (Big Ten), compiled a 4–7 record (4–4 against Big Ten opponents), and were outscored by their opponents, 238 to 154. The team played its home games in Kinnick Stadium in Iowa City, Iowa.

The team's statistical leaders included Phil Suess with 1,031 passing yards, Jeff Brown with 673 rushing yards, and Keith Chappelle with 1,037 receiving yards and 36 points scored. Several Iowa players also ranked among the Big Ten leaders in various statistical categories, including the following:
 Keith Chappelle led the Big Ten with 1,037 receiving yards and third in the conference with 64 receptions. 
 Norm Granger led the Big Ten with 29.9 yards per kickoff return.
 J. C. Love Jordan ranked third in the Big Ten with 348 kickoff return yards and 26.8 yard per kickoff return.
 Tracy Crocker ranked third in the Big Ten with 62 interception return yards.
 Reggie Roby ranked sixth in the Big Ten with a 40.0% field goal percentage and eighth with six field goals made.
 Phil Suess ranked sixth in the Big Ten with a 52.4 pass completion percentage and a 114.1 passing efficiency rating and eighth with 1,031 passing yards.
 Jeff Brown ranked sixth in the Big Ten with 5.1 yards per rushing attempt and eighth with 673 rushing yards.

Schedule

Roster

Game summaries

at Indiana

On September 13, Iowa opened its 1980 season with a 16–7 victory over Indiana. Jeff Brown rushed for 176 yards and caught five passes in his first start as Iowa's tailback.

at Nebraska

On September 20, in the Iowa–Nebraska football rivalry, Iowa was "humiliated" by Nebraska (AP No. 6) by a 57–0 score in front of a crowd of 76,029 in Lincoln, Nebraska. The 57-point loss was the worst football defeat for Iowa in 30 years. Nebraska's Jarvis Redwine rushed for 153 yards on 12 carries.

Iowa State

On September 27, Iowa played Iowa State in the fourth modern edition of the Iowa–Iowa State football rivalry, a game dubbed "Sic Em IV". Iowa lost by a 10–7 score before a crowd of 60,145 at Kinnick Stadium in Iowa City. Iowa quarterback Phil Suess threw a 20-yard touchdown pass in the second quarter, but he was unavailable to play in the second half after sustaining a sprained shoulder on his throwing arm.  With less than a minute to go, Iowa drove to Iowa State's nine-yard line, but opted to go for the win rather than kick a game-tying field goal.

Arizona

    
    

On October 4, Iowa lost to Arizona, 5–3, before a crowd of 59,950 at Kinnick Stadium in Iowa City. After fans booed the Hawkeyes during the game, Iowa coach Hayden Fry noted that "Iowa fans have more experience at booing than anybody else in the country."  Iowa's only points came on a Reggie Roby field goal in the fourth quarter. Roby then missed a 48-yard attempt with 2:28 remaining in the game. Iowa also gave up two points on a safety when Arizona blocked a punt out of the end zone.

Illinois

On October 11, Illinois defeated Iowa, 20–14, before a crowd of 59,780 at Kinnick Stadium. Illinois led, 20-0, early in the third quarter  when Illinois cornerback Rick George returned a fumble 13 yards for a touchdown on the third play of the second half. Iowa then mounted a comeback that fell short. Keith Chappelle led the comeback effort, catching two touchdown passes in the second half. Chappelle broke an Iowa single-game record with 191 receiving yards and tied another with 11 receptions.

Northwestern

On October 18, Iowa defeated Northwestern, 25–3, before a homecoming crowd of 59,990 in Iowa City. In his first game as Iowa's starting tailback, Phil Blatcher rushed for 148 yards on 19 carries, including a 51-yard gain on a Statue of Liberty play, and also caught a touchdown pass.

at Minnesota

On October 25, in the annual battle for the Floyd of Rosedale trophy, Minnesota defeated Iowa, 24–6, before a crowd of 58,158 in Minneapolis. Iowa fumbled eight times, gave up eight sacks, and managed to score only two field goals. Marion Barber, Jr. scored three rushing touchdowns for Minnesota.

Wisconsin

On November 1, Iowa defeated Wisconsin, 22–13, in Iowa City. In his first game as Iowa's starting quarterback, Pete Gales completed nine of 22 passes for 161 yards and rushed for 41 yards. One of Gales' completions was good for 54 yards and a touchdown to Keith Chappelle. Iowa scored another touchdown when Iowa linebacker Andre Tippett forced a fumble by Wisconsin quarterback John Josten, and Mark Bortz recovered the ball in the end zone.

at Purdue

    
    
    
    
    
    
    
    
    
    
    
    

On November 8, #17 Purdue defeated Iowa, 58–13, at Ross–Ade Stadium in West Lafayette. Mark Herrmann set a Purdue single-game record with 439 passing yards. Hermann also set an NCAA career record with 1,151 pass completions.

Ohio State

On November 15, Ohio State easily defeated Iowa, 41–7, in Iowa City. Art Schlichter threw two touchdown passes, and Calvin Murray rushed for 183 yards to lead the Buckeyes.

at Michigan State

    
    
    
    
    
    
    

On November 22, Iowa shut out Michigan State, 41–0, before a disappointed crowd of 55,123 fans at Spartan Stadium in East Lansing. After the game, Iowa coach Hayden Fry called it a "real fine victory," while Michigan State coach Muddy Waters said: "You saw it – rotten, lousy flat. It was about the worst game I ever saw. We were afraid it would happen, scared to death it would happen with an inexperienced team like we have."

Awards and honors

Team players in the 1981 NFL Draft

References

Iowa
Iowa Hawkeyes football seasons
Iowa Hawkeyes football